Philip Sutton Cox  (born 1 October 1939) is an Australian architect. Cox is the founding partner of Cox Architecture, one of the largest architectural practices in Australia.

He commenced his first practice with Ian McKay in 1962, and in 1967 he founded his own practice, Philip Cox and Associates. The firm has grown to become Cox Architecture, with offices across Australia as well as in Dubai and Abu Dhabi. Involved in much of concept design for each project over fifty years, Cox stepped back from the business in 2015 that is now responsible for projects throughout Australia and also in South-East Asia, China, the Middle East, South Africa and Europe.  He has been described as "epitomising the Sydney School of Architecture" in earlier projects. His work has won him multiple awards, the first being in 1963, one year after graduating from the University of Sydney. His most recent award was in 1989.

Early years and education
Philip Sutton Cox was born on 1 October 1939 to Ron and May Cox. He was their second child. He has one older sister, Judith. His childhood was comfortable, growing up in Killara on the North Shore in Sydney but he was born just one month after the start of World War II, which ended when he was six.

Cox attended Gordon Public School and then the Sydney Church of England Grammar School (Shore) in North Sydney. In his first years at Shore, art was taught by John Lipscombe, who had helped plan the new art block which had been praised by the architect Harry Seidler, who had lectured in the building in July 1952. Cox decided at quite an early age that he wanted to be an architect, though this was not clear until it was nearly time to leave school. He won a Commonwealth scholarship which was to pay his fees.

Cox studied at the University of Sydney between 1957 and 1962, where he graduated with a Bachelor of Architecture, then at the University of New South Wales between 1970 and 1975, where he was awarded a Doctorate of Science.

Major architectural works
Cox was the architect responsible for initially implementing the American Radburn design for public housing in New South Wales.

Cox and his firm have designed many iconic public buildings in Australia and throughout South East Asia including a number of the buildings used for the Sydney Olympics. The following list provides a summary of some of the major architectural design works of Cox and his firm, ordered from earliest to most recent, where Cox has either worked individually or as part of consortia:

Awards
Cox has received the Sir Zelman Cowen Award, the RAIA Gold Medal in 1984, Life Fellowship to the RAIA in 1987 and Honorary Fellowship of the American Institute of Architects in the same year. In 1988 he was appointed an Officer of the Order of Australia in recognition of service to architecture. In 1993 he received the inaugural award for Sport and Architecture from the International Olympic Committee, and is a Fellow of the Australian Academy of the Humanities.

Cox has held a range of voluntary positions during his professional career including Vice President, Environment Board, RAIA, NSW Chapter; a Member, Historic Buildings Committee, Cancer Patients Assistance Society of NSW; Vice President, Cancer Patients Assistance Society of NSW; Vice Chairman, Architecture and Design Panel, Visual Arts Board, Australia Council; and Chairman of Education Board of the RAIA, Federal Chapter.

Personal life
Cox is separated from wife Louise Cox AO, a fellow architect. They married in Sydney in April 1972 and have two daughters, Charlotte and Sophie. His partner of over two decades is the journalist Janet Hawley.

References

Further reading
 
 
 
 
 

Patrick Bingham-Hall (2020). Philip Cox: An Australian Architecture. Pesaro Publishing.

External links
 
 
 

 Philip Cox unleashed - ABC radio

New South Wales architects
20th-century Australian architects
21st-century Australian architects
Living people
Officers of the Order of Australia
Recipients of the Royal Australian Institute of Architects’ Gold Medal
1939 births
Fellows of the American Institute of Architects
Radburn design housing estates
People educated at Sydney Church of England Grammar School
University of Sydney alumni
University of New South Wales alumni
Sports venue architects